Don Arnott (3 March 1936 – 11 April 2019) was a Zimbabwean cricketer who played in twenty-eight first-class matches for Rhodesia between 1954 and 1962. His son, Kevin, played international cricket for Zimbabwe.

See also
 List of Rhodesian representative cricketers

References

External links
 

1936 births
2019 deaths
Zimbabwean cricketers
Rhodesia cricketers